Stephenson is a medieval patronymic surname meaning "son of Stephen". The earliest public record is found in the county of Huntingdonshire in 1279. There are variant spellings including Stevenson. People with the surname include:

Ashley Stephenson (born 1982), Canadian hockey and baseball player
Ashley Stephenson (1927–2021), British horticulturalist
Benjamin Stephenson (disambiguation), several people
Ben Stephenson, Anglo-American television executive
Chandler Stephenson (born 1994), Canadian ice hockey player
Charles Bruce Stephenson (1929–2001), American astronomer
D. C. Stephenson (1891–1966), American, Ku Klux Klan leader
Debra Stephenson (born 1972), British actress
Dwight Stephenson, American football player
Earl Stephenson (born 1947), American baseball pitcher
Gene Stephenson, American college baseball coach
George Stephenson (1781–1848), British mechanical engineer who created Stephenson's Rocket
George Robert Stephenson (engineer) (1819–1905), English civil engineer (nephew of George Stephenson)
George Stephenson (disambiguation), multiple other people
Gilbert Stephenson (1878–1972), British Vice Admiral
Gordon Stephenson (1908–1997), Australian town planner and architect
Helga Stephenson, Canadian media executive
Henry Stephenson (1871–1956), British actor
Isaac Stephenson (1829–1918), U.S. politician from Wisconsin
Jim Stephenson, New Zealand international football (soccer) goalkeeper
John Stephenson (disambiguation), people named John Stephenson
June Ethel Stephenson (1914–1999), Australian artist
Lance Stephenson (born 1990), American professional basketball player
M. F. Stephenson (1801 – after 1878), U.S. assayer of the Dahlonega, Georgia Mint
Neal Stephenson (born 1959), U.S. author
Nicola Stephenson (born 1971), British actress
Pamela Stephenson (born 1949), New Zealand-Australian comedian, actress and psychologist, also known as Pamela Connolly
Paul Stephenson (footballer), former British footballer.
Paul Stephenson (civil rights campaigner), British civil rights campaigner.
Sir Paul Stephenson, former London Metropolitan Police Commissioner.
Paul Stephenson (rugby league), Australian professional rugby league footballer.
Riggs Stephenson (1898–1985), U.S. baseball player
Robert Stephenson (1803–1859), British civil and railway engineer (son of George Stephenson)
Rosie Stephenson-Goodknight (born 1953), U.S. Wikipedia editor
Samuel M. Stephenson (1803–1859), U.S. politician from Michigan
Sean Stephenson (1979–2019), American therapist, writer, and speaker
Shay Stephenson (born 1983), Canadian ice hockey player
Thomas Alan Stephenson (1898–1961), British zoologist
Tyler Stephenson (b. 1996), American baseball player
William Stephenson (1897–1989), Canadian soldier, airman, businessman, inventor, and spymaster
William Stephenson (psychologist) (1902–1989), psychologist and physicist
William Haswell Stephenson (1836–1918), English industrialist and philanthropist in Newcastle upon Tyne

See also
Justice Stephenson (disambiguation)

References

English-language surnames
Patronymic surnames

de:Stephenson
es:Stephenson
fr:Stephenson
pt:Stephenson
ru:Стефенсон
vo:Stephenson
Surnames from given names